Myx Music Awards 2017 was the 12th installment of the Myx Music Awards, acknowledging the biggest hit makers of 2016 in the Philippine music industry. For the sixth consecutive year, fans could vote online through the Myx website.

Nominees were announced on February 2, 2017 starting at 5pm via Facebook Live streaming. Leading the nominees was Elmo Magalona with seven nominations.

The awards night was held on March 16, 2017 at Kia Theater, Araneta Center, Cubao, Quezon City at 8:00PM (PST). It was telecast live on Myx channel on cable and via live streaming on their website, via Facebook live and YouTube live streaming.

Winners and nominees
Winners are listed first and highlighted in boldface.

Multiple awards

Artists with multiple wins
The following artists received two or more awards:

Artists with multiple nominations
The following artists received more than two nominations:

References

External links
 Myx official site

Myx Music Awards
2017 music awards
Philippine music awards
Myx